Lebia viridis is a species of predatory ground beetle in the family Carabidae. It is found in North America, Guatemala, Mexico and on Cuba. It measure 5 to 7 mm. Diurnal; can sometimes be very common on flowers and vegetation.

References

Further reading

viridis
Beetles described in 1823
Taxa named by Thomas Say